Kyle Ivan Secor (born May 31, 1957) is an American television and film actor. He is known for portraying Detective Tim Bayliss on the crime drama series Homicide: Life on the Street (1993–1999).

Early years
Secor was born in Tacoma, Washington as the youngest boy in a family of three boys. He grew up in nearby Federal Way and graduated from Federal Way High School in 1975. His father worked in sales. As a boy, he wanted to be a professional basketball player, and at 6'4" had the height and build, but his dreams of going pro or becoming a professional were hindered as he suffered extreme near-sightedness, so he was forced to look elsewhere for a career.

Career

After attending a community college, Secor moved to Los Angeles. There, he performed in plays such as And a Nightingale Sang at the Santa Monica Playhouse (1986), Look Homeward, Angel (1986) and In the Jungle of Cities (1987) at the Pasadena Playhouse. 

Secor's first major television role was the character Brian Bradford on the soap opera Santa Barbara, soon followed by a stint on the hospital drama St. Elsewhere, in which he played Brett Johnston, a patient dying of AIDS.

After working in several movies, including Heart of Dixie (1989), City Slickers (1991), Sleeping with the Enemy (1991), Delusion (1991), and Untamed Heart (1993), Secor was cast as Det. Tim Bayliss in the pilot of Homicide: Life on the Street in 1993, a role which he would fill for the entirety of the series. Throughout most of this time, Secor was paired on screen with actor Andre Braugher, who played his partner Det. Frank Pembleton. Though the show was an ensemble work, Secor's character was placed in a particularly pivotal role, as the series began its first episode on his first day of work in the Baltimore homicide unit, and ended with his resignation in the series finale. Bayliss' character was conflicted through much of the show's run, obsessed with the murder of a Baltimore child he and Pembleton could not solve. The character also had issues involving social protest, past molestation by an uncle and questions about his own sexuality.

After a successful seven-year run on Homicide, Secor went on to a short-lived role on Party of Five and made two feature films, Endsville and Beat. He returned to the small screen as a doctor in the CBS production, City Of Angels, for nine weeks during the fall of 2000. He appeared in the made-for-TV movie Bailey's Mistake, which was shown on ABC on March 18, 2001. He appeared in the pilot episode of Crossing Jordan in the fall of 2001 and had a recurring supporting role in the cancelled ABC production of Steven Bochco's Philly from September 2001 through May 2002. In fall 2002 he was seen as a guest star on CBS's Without a Trace. Spring of 2004 brought Lifetime's Infidelity opposite former Philly costar Kim Delaney, and the long-awaited Disney-ABC television film A Wrinkle in Time featuring him in the role of the Man with Red Eyes. He had a recurring role as Jake Kane in the 2004–2005 freshman season of the show Veronica Mars and guest-starred in the series finale.

From 2005 to 2006, he starred with Geena Davis in ABC's Commander in Chief, playing Rod Calloway, the husband and 'first gentleman' of President Mackenzie Allen, the first female President. In 2007, he played Alan 'Skip' Matthews in the short-lived show Hidden Palms.

Secor had a recurring role as Hanson North, a defense attorney who has a romantic history with Laura Harris' character in ABC's Women's Murder Club, 2007 – 2008.

He also acted in Boston Legal as Dr. Robert L. Brooks, who was married to Phoebe Prentice, a former flame of Alan Shore. Also, he guest starred in Ghost Whisperer as Doug Bancroft. In August 2010 he made a guest appearance on The Closer as an airline pilot involved in drug smuggling. Secor appeared on the revival of the television series Hawaii Five-0 on the fifth episode of their first season, "Nalowale", playing Ambassador Michael Reeves. In 2016, he portrayed presidential candidate Minister Edwidge Owens running opposite Sen. Charlene “Charlie” Roan (Elizabeth Mitchell) in The Purge: Election Year. He also had a recurring role as Thomas Snow/Icicle on the 2018-19 fifth season of The Flash.

In 2021, Secor published a semi-autobiographical book titled DEATH of the ACTOR: Everything I Never Learned About Nothing where he explores the concept of nonduality as it pertains to acting.

Personal life
Secor married actress Kari Coleman on January 28, 2002. They have two children.

Filmography

References

External links
Official website

1957 births
Living people
American male film actors
American male television actors
Male actors from Tacoma, Washington
People from Federal Way, Washington
20th-century American male actors
21st-century American male actors
American people of Norwegian descent